Battling ropes (also known as battle ropes or heavy ropes) are used for fitness training to increase full body strength and conditioning. It was designed by John Brookfield in 2006, who developed the system around his backyard. It can be alternatively used as a resistance training technique. After its development, he taught the system to Special Forces, the Cincinnati Bengals, and the Olympic wrestling team. Since then, the training system has increased in popularity and has expanded to mainstream gyms.

Battling ropes have numerous advantages including the fact they are safe, easy to use, and increase power output. With one battle rope per upper extremity, they also work out each arm Independently, overcoming strength imbalances. It also reduces orthopedic load on joints.

Rope workouts has benefits. For example, a small study in 2015 showed that a 10-minute workout with the ropes increased heart rate and energy expenditure. Another study showed multiple physical fitness benefits to collegiate basketball players.

Battling ropes are thick and heavy and strong en to give significant resistance, and there are numerous types of ropes used. The ropes typically have two common diameters (25 mm and 44 mm) and common standard lengths (5 m, 10 m, and 25 m). Some battle ropes now have a flexible metal core, making them heavier, shorter and allowing the user to move during training without being restricted by an anchor point.

Exercises 
There are three common exercises that one can perform with battle ropes: the wave, slams, and pulls. The wave is where one makes a continuous wave with the ropes. Slams are similar to making the wave, except the rope is slammed each time. Pulls are when one pulls the rope towards oneself, either simultaneously or alternatively. There are a multitude of other exercises that work various muscles of the body. For instance, moving the ropes side to side will work out the hips and core to improve total body stability, whereas moving the ropes in circles will increase shoulder range of motion. A tire can be added to the end to increase resistance when pulling.

Types of battle rope waves 

 Vertical Waves with a Single Rope: The trainee holds one end of the battle rope with two hands and stands with the feet shoulder-width apart, keeping the back straight and core engaged and driving the wave all the way to the end. Raise your arms up and down to generate force (waves) moving down the rope.

 Alternating Waves: The trainee Performs this movement by alternating arms, with one end of the rope in each hand. The basic premise of alternating waves is one arm generates the wave, then the other arm and back. Within alternating waves can include standing, kneeling, pulling the rope up to down or down to up, one can also add rotation into the movement as well. Alternating waves can be performed by standing with the feet a bit more than shoulder-width apart, keeping the core engaged as well as the back and neck straight. There should not be too much tension in the rope, causing you to lean over.

References

Exercise equipment